Christina Nilsson (born 1956) is a Swedish  politician who was a Member of the Riksdag for a month in late 2021.

See also 
 List of members of the Riksdag, 2018–2022

References 

Living people
1956 births
Members of the Riksdag from the Sweden Democrats
Members of the Riksdag 2018–2022
Members of the Riksdag from the Christian Democrats (Sweden)
21st-century Swedish politicians
21st-century Swedish women politicians
Women members of the Riksdag